Historical classical music recordings are generally classical music recordings made prior to the stereo era of vinyl disc recording, which began around 1957.

As time passes, even later recordings, made in the early stereo era are also being released as "historical" recordings, especially if they were never released or were dropped from the record catalogs due to loss of popularity or "antiquated" sound. Typically such recordings are of artists and performances that were particularly notable at the time they were first released, or were unavailable because they were private recordings made at concerts or radio broadcasts. The latter can be of rather high quality if the recording derives from tapes made and archived by the broadcaster or the organization mounting the performance.

Recordings issued by arts organizations 
Important sources of historical recordings are the broadcast archives of orchestras and opera companies. For instance, the Met Opera of New York has issued a number of historical broadcast recordings which are only available upon making a donation. In the late 1980s, the Metropolitan Opera Guild issued a large number of two-disc compilations of historical recordings called Great Operas at the Met. Each album featured recorded performances of arias from a particular opera, generally beginning in the early 20th century and continuing up into the early stereo era.

The Boston Symphony Orchestra issued a 12-CD box entitled Boston Symphony Orchestra Symphony Hall Centennial Celebration: From the Broadcast Archives 1943-2000 in the 1980s. These recordings are now available for download from the orchestra's web site.

Major label reissues 
Many of the major record labels have also reissued important historical recordings. For example, Philips Records issued a 200-CD series of recordings entitled Great Pianists of the 20th Century in 1999.

Record labels specializing in historic recordings 
There are a number of record labels that have primarily issued historic classical recordings or have treated them as an important category.

Examples include:
 Arbiter Records.
 Centaur Records
 Fonit Cetra
 Golden Melodram
 Harmonia Mundi
 Hunt
 Laudis
 Legato Classics
 Marston Records
 Music & Arts
 Pearl
 Sakuraphon.
 Standing Room Only
 Symposium Cds.
 Testament Records
 Verona

Recordings made and shared privately by clubs, internet groups, blogs, and other aficionado-run free forums  
Recordings made from radio and internet broadcasts, in-house personal microphones and recording devices, and from performer's earpiece monitor transmissions are archived and disseminated in various ways. This kind of documentation of live performance is also known as a Recording Of Indeterminate Origin, or ROIO. Many blogs, clubs, internet groups and other forums exist whose members contribute and receive ROIOs, many of which have never been available commercially. Most of these forums traffic in non-commercially available broadcast/other classical music recordings for free. Historic recordings that begin as freely traded ROIOs often surface later as commercial products.

Grammy Awards 
The Grammy Awards have a prize category for Best Historical Album since 1979 which does not distinguish between classical and non-classical albums. Past classical album Grammy winners and nominees have been:

 2022 Nomination: Glenn Gould—The Goldberg Variations—The Complete Unreleased 1981 Studio Sessions. Robert Russ, compilation producer; Martin Kistner, mastering engineer (Glenn Gould) (Sony Classical)
 2021 Nomination: Marian Anderson—Beyond the Music—Her Complete RCA Victor Recordings. Robert Russ, compilation producer; Andreas K. Meyer & Jennifer Nulsen, mastering engineers (Marian Anderson) (Sony Classical)
 2020 Nomination: The Great Comeback—Horowitz at Carnegie Hall. Robert Russ, compilation producer; Andreas K. Meyer & Jennifer Nulsen, mastering engineers (Vladimir Horowitz) (Sony Classical)
 2019 Nomination: A Rhapsody in Blue—The Extraordinary Life of Oscar Levant. Robert Russ, compilation producer; Andreas K. Meyer & Rebekah Wineman, mastering engineers (Oscar Levant) (Sony Classical)
 2018 Win: Leonard Bernstein—The Composer. Robert Russ, compilation producer; Martin Kistner & Andreas K. Meyer, master engineers  (Leonard Bernstein) (Sony Classical)
 2018 Nomination: Glenn Gould—The Goldberg Variations—The Complete Unreleased Recording Sessions, June 1955. Robert Russ, compilation producer; Mathias Erb, Martin Kistner & Andreas K. Meyer, mastering engineers (Glenn Gould) (Sony Classical)
 2017 Nomination: Vladimir Horowitz—The Unreleased Live Recordings 1966–1983. Bernard Horowitz, Andreas K. Meyer & Robert Russ, compilation producers; Andreas K. Meyer & Jeanne Montalvo, mastering engineers (Vladimir Horowitz) (Sony Classical)
 2014 Nomination: Wagner: Der Ring des Nibelungen (Deluxe Edition). Philip Siney, compilation producer; Ben Turner, mastering engineer (Sir Georg Solti and Vienna Philharmonic Orchestra) (Decca)
 2001 Nomination: The Rubinstein Collection. Nathaniel S. Johnson, compilation producer; Hsi-Ling Chang, Marian M. Conaty, Michael O. Drexler, Thomas MacCluskey, Ward Marston, James Nichols, Francis X. Pierce, Jon M. Samuels & Michael Sobol, mastering engineers (Arthur Rubinstein) (RCA Red Seal)
 2000 Nomination: The Mahler Broadcasts 1948–1982. Sedgwick Clark, compilation producer; Jon M. Samuels & Seth B. Winner, mastering engineers (New York Philharmonic) (New York Philharmonic Special Editions)
 1999 Nomination: New York Philharmonic—The Historic Broadcasts 1923 to 1987. Sedgwick Clark, compilation producer; Jon M. Samuels & Seth B. Winner, mastering engineers (New York Philharmonic) (New York Philharmonic Special Editions)
 1997 Nomination: Fritz Kreisler—The Complete RCA Recordings. John Pfeiffer, compilation producer; Harold Hogopian, Glen Kolotkin & Ward Marston, mastering engineers (Fritz Kreisler) (RCA Victor Gold Seal)
 1996 Win: The Heifetz Collection. J.J. Stelmach, art director; John Pfeiffer, compilation producer; Ray Hall, Thomas MacCluskey, James P. Nichols, Anthony Salvatore, Jon M. Samuels & David Satz (mastering engineers) (Jascha Heifetz & Various Artists) (RCA Victor Gold Seal)
 1995 Nomination: Andres Segovia—A Centenary Celebration. Israel Horowitz, compilation producer (Andres Segovia) (MCA Classics)
 1992 Nomination: The Complete Caruso. John Pfeiffer, album producer (Enrico Caruso) (RCA Victor Gold Seal)
 1992 Nomination: Igor Stravinsky—The Recorded Legacy. John McClure, album producer (Igor Stravinsky et al.) (Sony Classical)
 1991 Nomination: Beethoven: Symphonies 1–9 & Leonore Overture No. 3. John Pfeiffer, album producer (Arturo Toscanini and NBC Symphony Orchestra) (RCA Gold Seal)
 1991 Nomination: Verdi: Aida, Falstaff, Requiem, Te Deum, Va, Pensiero, Hymn of the Nations. John Pfeiffer, album producer (Arturo Toscanini and NBC Symphony Orchestra) (RCA Gold Seal)
 1987 Nomination: The Mapleson Cylinders. David Hamilton & Tom Owen, album producers (Various Metropolitan Opera Artists) (Rodgers and Hammerstein Archives)
 1986 Win: RCA/Met—100 Singers—100 Years. John Pfeiffer, album producer (Various Artists) (RCA Red Seal)
 1984 Win: The Greatest Recordings of Arturo Toscanini—Symphonies, Vol. I. Stanley Walker & Allan Steckler, album producers (Arturo Toscanini) (Franklin Mint Record Society)
 1983 Nomination: Bartok at the Piano, 1920–1945. Dora Antal, album producer (Béla Bartok) (Hungaroton)
 1981 Win: Segovia—The EMI Recordings 1927–39. Keith Hardwick, producer (Andrés Segovia) (Angel)
 1980 Nomination: A Tribute to E. Power Biggs. Andrew Kazdin, producer (E. Power Biggs et al.) (Columbia Masterworks)
 1979 Nomination: La Divina. Peter Andry & Walter Legge, producers (Maria Callas) (Angel)

Notes

See also 
Association for Recorded Sound Collections
Cylinder Preservation and Digitization Project

External links 
 UCSB: Special Collections: Performing Arts: Historical Sound Collections
 Yale University: Irving S. Gilmore Music Library
 New York Public Library:Rodgers and Hammerstein Archives of Recorded Sound
 National Recording Preservation Board

Recorded music
Classical albums